The Party is a Canadian drama film, directed by Pierre Falardeau and released in 1990. Loosely based on the prison experiences of convicted Front de libération du Québec terrorist Francis Simard, the film centres on the annual party at the St. Vincent de Paul penitentiary in Laval, Quebec, where a group of prison inmates get to enjoy outside entertainment.

Cast
The film's cast includes Charlotte Laurier, Julien Poulin, André Doucet, Gildor Roy, Angèle Coutu, Jacques Desrosiers, Louise Laprade and Alexis Martin.

Production
Producer Bernadette Payeur said the striptease scene was filmed at the old Saint-Vincent-de-Paul penitentiary. In the scene Charlotte Laurier strips completely naked in front of dozens of extras, many of whom were ex-convicts. "It wasn't always easy to keep them quiet!" - Payeur said.

Awards
The film received four Genie Award nominations at the 12th Genie Awards in 1991, for Best Supporting Actor (Poulin), Best Screenplay (Falardeau), Best Costume Design (Andrée Morin) and Best Editing (Michel Arcand).

References

External links
 

1990 films
1990 LGBT-related films
Canadian prison drama films
Canadian LGBT-related films
Laval, Quebec
LGBT-related drama films
1990s prison drama films
Films about parties
Films set in Quebec
Films shot in Quebec
Films directed by Pierre Falardeau
1990 drama films
French-language Canadian films
1990s Canadian films